Blaze Ya Dead Homie is the self-titled debut extended play of American hip hop artist Blaze Ya Dead Homie. Released on July 25, 2000, the EP is Blaze's first release on Psychopathic Records. Produced by Twiztid and Fritz the Cat, Blaze Ya Dead Homie features appearances by Insane Clown Posse and Twiztid.

Concept
Blaze Ya Dead Homie establishes the character portrayed by the artist, Blaze Ya Dead Homie, and provides basic background to his story. Blaze is a gang member who was killed in a drive-by shooting during the late 1980s. Over a decade later, he was "mysteriously resurrected from the dead."

Music and lyrics
Through the concept of a reincarnated gang member, Blaze was able to express his real life interest in the supernatural "alongside his history with the 'hood and affinity for gangster rap." Blaze considers Blaze Ya Dead Homie his most realistic album because he incorporated much of his personal experience into the EP. He has continued to use much of the same styles and themes throughout all of his work since creating the Blaze Ya Dead Homie character. The theme of reincarnation in this EP also served as a metaphor in reality, as Blaze was returning to rapping after he had quit for a short period due to an unsuccessful early career.

Insane Clown Posse and Twiztid appeared on the final track, "Shittalkaz", a diss track. Blaze's verse was directed toward Skrapz, his former rap partner, while Twiztid's verse was directed toward their former manager, and ICP's verse was directed toward Eminem.

Reissue
Blaze Ya Dead Homie has never been reissued since going out of print. The majority of the EP's track listing was combined with the album 1 Less G n da Hood and three new songs. This configuration was released under the title 1 Less G in the Hood: Deluxe G Edition. This reissue deleted the EP's final track, "Shittalkaz".

Track listing

References

2000 debut EPs
Blaze Ya Dead Homie albums
Psychopathic Records EPs